Meltem Kaptan (born 8 July 1980 Gütersloh) is a Turkish German actress and comedian. She won a Silver Bear for Best Leading Performance at the 2022 Berlin International Film Festival.

Life 
She studied at  Philipps University, Marburg, Boğaziçi Üniversitesy, and  Western Washington University. She hosted  (The great Bake) in 2013, and 
 in 2019.

Filmography 
 Mortal World 2018

 Rabiye Kurnaz vs. George W. Bush 2021

References

External links
 

1980 births
Living people
German actresses
German women comedians
Silver Bear for Best Leading Performance winners